The Impossible Man is a fictional character appearing in American comic books published by Marvel Comics. He first appeared in Fantastic Four #11 (February 1963), and was created by writer Stan Lee and writer/artist Jack Kirby. The Impossible Man has been featured in other Marvel-endorsed products such as action figures, arcade and video games, animated television series, and merchandise such as trading cards.

The Impossible Man is a Poppupian from the planet Poppup and has shape-changing abilities. The character is primarily used for comedy as he is portrayed as a lonely, attention seeking alien that often annoys those around him, especially the Fantastic Four. Over the years, the Impossible Man created a wife called The Impossible Woman and also had a son named Adolf Impossible.

The Impossible Man has made various appearances in Marvel cartoon series, such as the 1978 and 1994 Fantastic Four series as well as Fantastic Four: World's Greatest Heroes.

Publication history
The Impossible Man first appeared in Fantastic Four #11 (Feb 1963), and was created by Stan Lee and Jack Kirby. According to Lee in a 1970 interview, this "was the worst-selling Fantastic Four we've ever had". In Lee's opinion, the green alien on the cover was "too unusual and too frivolous."

After a long absence, Impossible Man returned in Fantastic Four #175 (Oct 1976) and visited the Marvel Comics office. At the end of the story, he was adopted by the Fantastic Four. This time, the character became popular. He remained a regular part of the comic until #195 (June 1978), when Sue told him that she was tired of him, and he turned into a bee and flew away.

Originally, there were no limits to Impossible Man's transforming abilities - he convincingly imitated Sue Richards in Fantastic Four #175 (Oct 1976) and President Jimmy Carter in Marvel Two-in-One #27 (May 1977) - but in The New Mutants Annual #3 (Sept 1987), he could only turn into something that was green and purple, and that limitation has stuck ever since.

Fictional character biography

1960s 
When the Impossible Man first appeared, he was different from previous guest stars in that he was not a villain. The team first meet him at the Flamingo restaurant when they are summoned there to investigate a disturbance.  Written by Lee to be a prankster and hedonist, the Impossible Man claimed to belong to the alien race of Poppupians from planet Poppup in the "Tenth Galaxy", who all share a collective consciousness and the ability to shapeshift, as their planet is so dangerous they have the ability to evolve very quickly. Seeking amusement, the character visits Earth for a vacation by turning himself into a spaceship, talking of a Poppup Tourist Bureau. After finding the superhero team the Fantastic Four and realizing nobody else on Earth has his power (therefore concluding he is the most powerful being on Earth), he constantly harasses them until they decide to ignore him and tell other people to do the same, forcing the Impossible Man to leave as he finds Earth so boring, and saying Earth will never get their tourist business. He gets his name after the Thing claims he is "impossible".

1970s 
The character does not appear again until 1976. Acting as a deus ex machina in a storyline involving the cosmic entity and world-devourer Galactus, the Impossible Man convinces him to consume his homeworld Poppup instead of Earth, causing Galactus to seemingly perish from 'cosmic indigestion'. Since the Poppupians were a shared consciousness they were happy to sacrifice their planet to stop Galactus, knowing that their culture would live on in the embodiment of its most adventurous member. The Impossible Man then makes a humorous appearance at the offices of Marvel Comics, where he causes havoc until Stan Lee promises to give him his own title.

He offers peripheral assistance to the Fantastic Four when they are trapped in the Negative Zone by the Frightful Four, a team of their enemies. The Impossible Man impersonates Jimmy Carter, on the day when he is to be inaugurated as President of the United States and briefly takes his place to foil an attempt to enslave him during an adventure with the Thing and the cyborg Deathlok. He later saves the Invisible Woman from a fall and becomes fascinated with Earth movies. When returning to the Baxter Building, headquarters of the Fantastic Four, the Impossible Man is surprised and defeated by the villain Klaw, who, in an alliance with the Molecule Man, attempts to kill the Fantastic Four. During the course of the storyline, the character recovers and, courtesy of his abilities, mimics and defeats Klaw in turn and assists the Fantastic Four in stopping the Molecule Man. The character continued his trend of general disruption during a visit to Hollywood with the Invisible Girl.

1980s 
After helping the Thing defeat several villains at a party, the Impossible Man observes the Thing with his partner Alicia Masters and becomes lonely. The character then decides to reproduce - here an asexual process - by splitting in two.  This creates fellow Poppupian the Impossible Woman. The pair later attempt to recreate their race and create the Impossible Kids, with the entire "family" visiting the Thing. When the Impossible Woman is missing, the character hires private investigator Jessica Drew to locate her, and has an encounter with the mutant X-Men after stealing artifacts from Earth to settle a supposed family dispute with the other members of his race.

More comedic adventures followed, with the Impossible Man engaging in a shapeshifting competition with Warlock, causing havoc on an alternate universe version of Earth, and trying to obtain the movie rights to the autobiography of professional sidekick Rick Jones.

1990s 
The Impossible Man finds and teases the cosmic being the Silver Surfer on two occasions, pleading for him to develop a sense of humor before battling the titan Thanos. The character returns to Earth and causes more mischief, encounters the hero Daredevil while looking for a lost child, starts a bar fight, watches the Eternal Makkari win a galactic marathon, and invites various otherwise un-contacted heroes and supervillains to the wedding of Rick Jones.

After a brief encounter with the young superhero team the New Warriors, the character enlists the aid of mutant team X-Force to instill some pride in his children, and enters into a wager with the alternate universe imp Mister Mxyzptlk.

2000s 
The Impossible Man and the Poppupians make a cameo appearance in Noh-Varr's origin story.

The Impossible Man returns to Earth disguised as the Silver Surfer, and after teasing the hero Spider-Man warns of an alien invasion. The Impossible Man's race are also revealed to have survived, with their consciousness stored inside the character. With the aid of the Fantastic Four, the aliens and the newly reborn Poppupians are transported off world, merging into one race on Spider-Man's suggestion.

2010s 
Later during the Chaos War, the Impossible Man confronts Mikaboshi, trying to humor and reason with him while shapeshifting in various forms to divert him, but the Chaos King tires of him and brutally dispatches him. Impossible Man's last words are "I thought we were just playing around..."

Impossible Man returns to Earth where he witnesses a battle between Hulk, Red Hulk, and Xemnu. Impossible Man uses his magic to combine Hulk and Red Hulk into the Compound Hulk. Impossible Man watches as the Compound Hulk fights Xemnu's minion Kluh (a smart version of the Gray Hulk).

Impossible Man is later shown to have a son named Adolf Impossible who has many of his father's fantastic powers and has a much more introverted personality. This causes Impossible Man to label Adolf as "entirely too possible" and plead with the Future Foundation to accept him and allow him to grow as a person.

Powers and abilities
The Impossible Man's unique physiology enables him to take on virtually any form via molecular manipulation, an effect commonly accompanied by a "Pop!" sound. He can mimic the properties of objects or humanoid beings at will. Almost every feature the Impossible Man copies another superhuman's appearance and their powers, such as Thor, Klaw, or even Wolverine. He has the ability to travel through hyperspace across different universes, psionically levitate himself, and reproduce asexually. The Impossible Man and his mate are able to survive in the vacuum of space for months without sustenance by inducing a low-metabolic rate onto themselves.

The Impossible Man possesses total knowledge of Earth's popular culture.

Other versions

Wha...Huh?
Impossible Man appears in the spoof comic "Wha...Huh?" in the segment titled "What If Identity Crisis Happened in the Marvel Universe". He appears as a villain that few of the heroes remember.

The Cross-Time Caper
The Impossible Man appears in Excalibur, during the Cross-Time Caper. He has populated an analogue of the Earth with multiple twisted versions of the superheroes of the Marvel Universe (such as Daredevil, the 'Man without Common Sense').  This version of the Earth is destroyed by Galactus, who deems it "Too silly to be allowed to exist", and deems the Impossible Man as "In your own way... as great a threat as the Phoenix". Once Galactus leaves, Impossible Man repopulates the planet effortlessly, allowing the mayhem to begin again. His powers in this reality generate a 'Pip' rather than a 'Pop'.

In other media

Television
 The Impossible Man appears in a self-titled episode of the 1978 Fantastic Four series, voiced by Frank Welker.
 The Impossible Man appears in the 1994 Fantastic Four series episode "Hopelessly Impossible", voiced by Jess Harnell.
 The Impossible Man appears in Fantastic Four: World's Greatest Heroes, voiced by Terry Klassen.
 The Impossible Man appears in The Super Hero Squad Show, voiced again by Jess Harnell. After making a minor appearance in the episode "Tremble at the Might of... M.O.D.O.K.!", the Impossible Man appears in the episode "Missing: Impossible!" to live with the Super Hero Squad after being kicked out by his wife. Unable to handle his mischief, the heroes decide to help him restore his relationship by having him fight the Dark Surfer. In the subsequent duel, the Impossible Man inadvertently creates a black hole until the Super Hero Squad and Mister Fantastic help him close it. In the aftermath, Impossible Man and his wife reconcile.
 The Impossible Man appears in the Avengers Assemble episode "Avengers: Impossible", voiced by Tom Kenny. While evading the Chitauri, he arrives on Earth, where he witnesses Falcon and the Avengers fighting the Wrecking Crew. Impossible Man frees the latter and traps the former so Falcon can single-handedly defeat the Wrecking Crew instead as part of a show about the hero. The Avengers fight back and temporarily trap Impossible Man, but he escapes and summons Attuma, Ulik, the Midgard Serpent, and Wendigo so Falcon can defeat them as well, but the hero forces him to send the villains away. When the Chitauri arrive on Earth, Falcon "deputizes" Impossible Man as an Avenger so the latter can help his team fend them off.
 Impossible Man appears in the Hulk and the Agents of S.M.A.S.H. episode "Mission Impossible Man", voiced again by Tom Kenny. He arrives at the agents of S.M.A.S.H.'s base posing as Fin Fang Foom and fights them until the Hulk sees through his ploy. Impossible Man voices his desire to join the agents of S.M.A.S.H. and combines the Hulk and Red Hulk into a Two-Headed Compound Hulk. When Sauron attacks a nearby amusement park, Impossible Man joins the agents of S.M.A.S.H. in fending him off, only to lose his powers to the villain, who uses them to summon the real Fin Fang Foom. When the monster knocks Sauron away, Impossible Man regains his powers and borrows a device from Hank Pym's laboratory to enlarge the Two-Headed Compound Hulk so they can defeat Fin Fang Foom before separating the two Hulks, who send Impossible Man away.

Video games
In the online MMO Super Hero Squad Online, the player can find the Impossible Man hiding all around town. If the player finds him five times with the same character, the player can fight him.

References

External links
 Impossible Man at Marvel.com
 Impossible Man at Marvel Database
 Impossible Man at Comic Vine
 Impossible Man at Writeups.org
 Impossible Man at Don Markstein's Toonopedia. Archived from the original on September 1, 2016.

Characters created by Jack Kirby
Characters created by Stan Lee
Comics characters introduced in 1963
Fictional characters who can duplicate themselves
Fictional characters with dimensional travel abilities
Fictional characters with slowed ageing
Fictional pranksters
Marvel Comics characters who are shapeshifters
Marvel Comics superheroes
Marvel Comics supervillains